Eyre Square is a city public park in Galway, Ireland. The park is within the city centre, adjoining the nearby shopping area of William Street and Shop Street.  Galway railway station is adjacent to Eyre Square.

The park is rectangular, surrounded on three sides by streets that form the major traffic arteries into Galway city centre; the west side of the square was pedestrianised in 2006. The square is occasionally although rarely sometimes referred to as John F. Kennedy Memorial Park.

History

The origin of the square comes from medieval open space in front of a town gate, known as the Green. Markets mostly took place in the northern part of the space. The earliest endeavour to formally enclose it was recorded in 1631. Some ash-trees were planted and the park was enclosed by a wooden fence. The plot of land that became Eyre Square was officially presented to the city in 1710 by Mayor Edward Eyre, from whom it took its name. In 1801, General Meyrick erected a stone wall around the square, which was later known as Meyrick Square. In the middle of the 19th century, the whole park underwent a redevelopment in Georgian style. In the 1960s, a full-scale reconstruction started and iron railings were removed and raised around the backyard of St. Nicholas' Collegiate Church.

In 1965, the square was officially renamed "John F. Kennedy Memorial Park" in honour of U.S. President John F. Kennedy; despite the renaming, the square is still widely known as Eyre Square. Kennedy had visited Galway City and made a speech in the square on 29 June 1963, the first U.S. president to do so during his term of office.

Controversy
A controversial and massively over-budget redevelopment of the square began in 2004. There was considerable unease in the city when it was reported that the original building contractors, Samuel Kingston Construction Ltd, had left the site and were not returning. After many long delays the square finally reopened on 13 April 2006 having astonishingly cost over €20 million to redevelop. Despite an unpopular reception by Galway natives, the finished square received the Irish Landscape Institute Design Award in 2007.

Occupy Galway 

Eyre Square hosted the third longest Occupy Camp in the world, that ran for 216 days consecutively. A small group of concerned Galwegians came together in October 2011, inspired by the Occupy Wall Street movement that had very quickly spread out across hundreds of cities in the U.S. and the E.U. The main aim was for regular people to set-up a base in their local areas, utilising public spaces to facilitate general assemblies, workshops and debates to discuss and try find solutions to alarming social injustices and lack of accountability amongst states and banking institutions.

A mixed group volunteered their time to highlight the perceived wealth divide between those (the 1%) that helped create and profited from the bubble that caused the 2009 banking crash and the 99% that were forced to pay for it.

The camp was finally dismantled on 16 May 2013 when a team of local Garda and City Council officials arrived in the early hours to remove the occupiers and reclaim the corner of the square for the impending return of The Ocean Race to Galway.

The following year the occupiers held a one-day re-occupy event to mark the removal of the camp that featured a successful local media/billboard campaign to promote and highlight the event.

There have been no more Occupy Galway events since.

Statues and attractions

Before the most recent, controversial re-landscaping, the park used to house two large cast-iron cannons which were presented in recognition of the service of the Connaught Rangers, an Irish Regiment in the British Army, in the Crimean War. A statue of Irish language writer Pádraic Ó Conaire was erected in his memory in 1935. There is a portrait bust of U.S. President John F. Kennedy in the park, and a statue of Liam Mellows (1892–1992), a hero of the War of Independence, in the car park to the east of the Browne doorway.

The Browne doorway is also another attraction in Eyre Square; it was originally the doorway of the Browne family's home on Lower Abbeygate Street, but was moved in 1905 from Abbeygate Street to Eyre Square. Recently it has had to be shored up, buttressed and encased in plexiglass due to neglect. The name of the Browne family is also featured on one of the fourteen flags near the Browne doorway and the Quincentennial Fountain. These flags represent the Tribes of Galway (Treibheanna na Gaillimhe), fourteen merchant families who dominated the political, commercial, and social life of the city of Galway in western Ireland between the mid-13th and late 19th centuries.

References

External links
 Eyre Square Shopping Centre Website
 Virtual picture of Eyre Square

Geography of Galway (city)
Parks in County Galway
Squares in the Republic of Ireland
Tourist attractions in Galway (city)